This is a list of songs that topped the Belgian Walloon (francophone) Ultratop 40 in 2006.

Best-Selling Singles 

This is the ten best-selling/performing singles in 2006.

See also
2006 in music

References

2006 in Belgium
Belgium Ultratop 40
2006

de:Liste der Nummer-eins-Hits in Belgien (2006)